Proscelotes is a genus of skinks. The genus is endemic to Africa.

Species
The genus Proscelotes contains the following three species.

Proscelotes aenea  – montane skink
Proscelotes arnoldi  – Arnold's montane skink
Proscelotes eggeli  – Usambara five-toed skink

Nota bene: A binomial authority in parentheses indicates that the species was originally described in a genus other than Proscelotes.

References

Further reading
Branch, Bill (2004). Field Guide to Snakes and Other Reptiles of Southern Africa. Third Revised edition, Second impression. Sanibel Island, Florida: Ralph Curtis Books. 399 pp. . (Genus Proscelotes, p. 139).
de Witte G-F, Laurent RF (1943). "Contribution à la systématique des formes dégradées de la famille des Scincidae apparentées au genre Scelotes Fitzinger ". Mémoires du Musée royal d'histoire naturelle de Belgique, Series 2, 26: 1-44. (Proscelotes, new genus). (in French).

Proscelotes
Reptiles of Africa
Lizard genera
Taxa named by Raymond Laurent
Taxa named by Gaston-François de Witte